The Mason Historic District in Mason, Texas is listed on the National Register of Historic Places.  It was listed in 1974 and increased in 1991.  The original district was  forming an irregular pattern along both sides of U.S. 87 and TX 29 which included 186 contributing buildings and six contributing structures.  The increase added 14 contributing building and a contributing site on  roughly along Post Hill Rd. from College Ave. to Spruce St.

It includes the Mason County Courthouse.

It includes the local Odeon Theater as a contributing building.  In 2017, the theater claims it is the oldest operating theater in West Texas.

It includes:
Reynolds/Seaquist House (1887 & 1891), a three-story sandstone house built first as a two-story stone house, later enlarged with Richard Grosse as architect/builder
Mason House (c.1876), a two-story vernacular structure which was one of earliest hotels in Mason and served as a stage stop on the San Antonio to El Paso mail route;  was an apartment house in 1974.
St. Paul's Lutheran Church (1904), a cruciform Gothic Revival church
James E. Ranck Building (1874), the oldest sandstone commercial building surviving in Mason; housed the telegraph office during 1870s.

See also

National Register of Historic Places listings in Mason County, Texas

References

External links

Historic districts on the National Register of Historic Places in Texas
Gothic Revival architecture in Texas
Second Empire architecture in Texas
Neoclassical architecture in Texas
Tudor Revival architecture in Texas
Mason County, Texas